Babol (known as "Orange Blossom City" , also Romanized as Bābol; formerly known as Barfrouch) is the capital of Babol County, Mazandaran Province, Iran. Babol is divided into two metropolitan areas (under Iranian law). At the 2012 census, its population was 219,467, in 66,944 families.

Babol is located in the north of Iran, north-east of Tehran, between the northern slopes of the Alborz Mountains and southern coast of the Caspian Sea. The city is one of the most important cities in the north of Iran, known as a regional center for education, trade, industry, and medical services. 

Babol is a new name for the site of the ancient city of Mamatir, that then was named as Barforush. The city receives abundant rainfall. It is famous for its orange groves.

History and name

Founded by the Safavids in the 16th century, it was built on the site of the ancient city of Mamtir (deriving from "Mah Mithra" "great Mithra). Mithra or 'The Mediator' was believed to be the savior of creation from the threat of darkness and the one who stands between the light of Ahura Mazda and the darkness of Ahriman. Babol was formerly called Barforushdeh (meaning Market Town) and Barforush afterwards. In 1931, the founder of the Pahlavi dynasty Reza Shah (1878-1944) ordered urban planning efforts to commence in the city and changed its name to Babol, which means city with abundant water supply.

Geography and climate 
The city is located approximately 20 kilometers south of the Caspian Sea on the west bank of Babolrud River and receives abundant annual rainfall. Babol borders Babolsar and Fereydunkenar to the north, Qaem Shahr and Shirgah District to the east, Savadkuh to the southeast, Firuzkuh to the South and Amol to the west. Babol University is famous for its spectacular scenery.

The Köppen-Geiger climate classification system classifies its climate as humid subtropical climate (Köppen: Cfa, Trewartha: Cf)

Population 
In 2012 population census of the city, the population was 219,467 people (79,837 households) and a population of 495,472 people in the located in the city.

Mazandarani people have a background in Tabari ethnicity and speak Mazandarni. Their origin goes back to the Tapuri people, who were forced to migrate to the south coast of the Caspian Sea during the Achaemenid dynasty. 

The native people of Sari, Shahi, Babol, Amol, Nowshahr, Chalus, and Tonekabon are Mazandarani people and speak the Mazandarani language.

Landmarks 
The ruins of Shah Abbas I's palace are located in the city.
Mohammad Hassan Khan bridge is also one of the most ancient buildings of Mazandaran. It was built by the king Mohammad Hassan Khan Qajar, the ancestor of Agha Mohammad Khan Qajar as the main road from Babol to Amol. Now it is known as the old road of Babol to Amol. 
Babol also contains Babol Noshirvani Park, the largest park including a playground located in the northern part of Iran, located in the vicinity of Caspian Sea.
Babol is home to many important and intact forests and jungles, such as, Shiadeh, in south-east Babol.

Filband, a village near the northern Iranian city of Babol, is famous for its skies which are full of interconnected cumulus clouds, especially in springtime.

Historical and natural attractions 

 Mohammad Hassan Khan bridge
 Babol Royal Palace
 Babol Museum
 Emamzadeh Ghasem
 Kazem Beik Mosque
 Watchtower
 Babol Jameh Mosque
 Mohaddesin Mosque
 Tekyeh Moghri Kola
 Sultan Mohammad Taher Tomb Tower
 Darvish Fakhr Al-Din Tomb
 Post Building
 Head University of Medical Sciences
 Ibn Shahr Ashub Tomb
 Sarast Tower
 Darvish Alam-bazi Tower
 Hasirforoshan Mosque
 Azroud Thermal Spring
 Babolroud
 Babolkenar Forest Park
 Historic homes Qajansb
 Aghajan Nasab House
 Osia House
 Najafi Mansion
 Sheikh Mousa Yaylak and Waterfall
 Kimoun Waterfall
 Shiadeh Dam
 Saghanefar Kija Tekyeh
 Porang High School
 Shiadeh Saghanefar
 Abuol Hasan Kola Saghanefar
 Mulana Mosque
 Tirkan Waterfall
 Haft Waterfall
 Filband Village
 Bandpey Village
 Pir Alam Tekyeh
 Moftakher ul-Mamalek Caravanserai
 Sadr Hawza
 Chahar Suq Mosque
 Lafoor Jungle
 Bagh-e Ferdows
 Noshirvani Park

Economy 
Commerce and trading are the backbone of the city's economy since it is the largest commercial center for Mazandaran province, partially due to its location at the center of the province and also the large population of villages around the city, making Babol county the most populated county in the province.
Babol produces food and textiles — as well as other processed goods, including oranges, lemons, and tangerines. There are many rice farms around the city, and, until about 20 years ago, tea, tobacco, and cotton were processed.

The city is served by Refah Chain Stores Co., Iran Hyper Star, Isfahan City Center, Shahrvand Chain Stores Inc., Kowsar Market,, Ofoq Kourosh chain store.

Transportation
Almost all of the city transportation is by car, buses and other road vehicles. Thus, Babol is highly dependent on the regional highway network which connects the city to Babolsar 10 km north, Amol 30 km west and Qaemshahr 15 km east. These are all new wide highways.

Babol has access to an airport 55 km away and to a train station 15 km away.

The ports of Fereydunkenar and Babolsar are both located on the southern coast of the Caspian Sea with connection to other Caspian ports.

Colleges and universities 

As the largest commercial center, the city of Babol also hosts large number of universities province.  
Universities include:
 Babol Noshirvani University of Technology The university is an influential center for academic research in Iran, due to which it has been consistently ranked among the top schools in the country. BNUT is currently ranked 1st among all Iranian universities according to Times Higher Education (THE) World University Rankings. THE has also ranked BNUT between 351st and 400th among world universities, 55th among the world's young universities, as well as 43rd among Asian universities.
 Babol University of Medical Sciences
 Mazandaran University of Science and Technology
 Educators University - Education Center Martyr Rajai Babol
 PNU - Babol Center
 PNU - Bandpey Unit
 Islamic Azad University - Babol Unit
 University of Applied Science - Babol Unit
 Babol Vocational College of Imam Sadiq
 Mazandaran Institute of Technology
 Rahedanesh Institute of Higher Education
 Tabari Institute of Higher Education
 Aryan Institute of Science and Technology
 Institute of Applied Science of Art and Culture - Unit 4 Of Babol 
 Institute of Applied Science Technology Jahad Daneshgahi
 Institute of Applied Science -Unit Of Western Bandpey 
 Vocational College of Sama - Babol Unit
 Vocational College of AzZahra - Babol Unit

Health centers and hotels
Negin Hotel
Reza Hotel
Marjan Hotel
Ayatollah Rouhani Hospital
Babol Clinic
Shahid Beheshti Hospital
Fatemeh Al-Zahra Hospital
Yahya Nejad Hospital
17 Shahrivar Hospital
Mehregan Hospital

Industry

Major corporations 
 Iran Khodro Mazandaran
 Babol Machine Mfg. & Ind
 MSco
 Khazar Khodro Babol.Co

Sports
Babol is home to the Iranian Basketball Super League team BEEM Mazandaran BC which plays in the city's Shahid Sojoodi Arena.
BEEM also had a popular volleyball team in the Iranian Super League in 2008–2009.
Now Babol have a 2 Team in wrestling, Bime Razi and Arash Zin.
They have a popular football club, Khooneh Be Khooneh. Khooneh Be Khooneh play in the 1st division (after Premier League) in the Iranian system football. Babol was the host of Freestyle Wrestling Club World Cup in December 2018.

Notable people

 Amir Pazevari (17th century) - poet
 Muhammad Ashrafi (1804-1898) - Shia Marja'
 Mohammad-Ali Barfrushi (1820–1849) - Babi leader
 Hossein Fallah Noshirvani (1902–1972) - philanthropist
 Delkash (1924–2004) - singer
 Afshin (born 1978) - singer
 Sheikh Mohammad Haeri Mazandarani (1960) - religious
 Zeinolabedin Haeri Mazandarani (1919–1996) - religious
 Shahrokh Meskoob (1924–2005) - writer
 Davoud Rashidi (1933–2016) - actor
 Tal'at Basari (born 1925) - feminist writer
 Mokarrameh Ghanbari (1928–2005) - painter
 Ahmad Ghahreman (1928–2008) - botanist
 Emam-Ali Habibi (born 1931) - wrestler
 Hamid Reza Chitgar (1949–1987) - politician
 Bijan Mortazavi (born 1957) - singer and musician
 Towhidi Tabari (born 1964) - artist
 Zeinolabedin Rahnama (1893–1989) - writer
 Reza Salehi Amiri (born 1962) - politician
 Masoud Hedayatifard (born 1971) - scholar in fishery science
 Masih Alinejad (born 1976) - writer and journalist
 Sohrab Entezari (born 1977) - football player
 Ali Asghar Mazandarani (1826–1911) - cleric
 Farhad Rachidi (born 1962) - scientist
 Karim Motamedi (born 1929) - minister
 Hassan Ghashghavi (born 1957) - ambassador
 Hassan Anousheh (born 1945) - writer
 Arya Aramnejad (born 1983) - singer
 Leyli Rashidi (born 1973) - actress
 Maryam Kavyani (born 1970) - actress
 Maziar (1952–1997) - singer
 Morteza Pouraliganji (born 1992) - football player
 Mehdi Kheiri (born 1983) - football player
 Hadi Norouzi (1985–2015) - football player
 Bashir Babajanzadeh (born 1989) - wrestler
 Parinaz Izadyar (born 1985)- actress
 Sousan Hajipour (born 1990) - taekwondo practitioner
 Noshad Alamian (born 1991) - table tennis player
 Nima Alamian (born 1992) - table tennis player
 Mojtaba Mirzajanpour (born 1991) volleyball player
 Alireza Firouzja (born 2003) - chess player
 Mohammad Hossein Mahdavian (born 1981) - film director
 Parviz Bahram (1933–2019) - dubber

See also 
 Babolsar
 Babolrud

References

External links

 Babol Noshirvani University of Technology
 Views of Noshirvani Park
Ofoq kourosh

 
Cities in Mazandaran Province